Pen-y-garnedd is a village in the community of Pentraeth, Ynys Môn, Wales, which is 130.6 miles (210.2 km) from Cardiff and 210.1 miles (338.2 km) from London.

References

See also 
 List of localities in Wales by population

Villages in Anglesey